Payaneh-ye Bar Yazd (also Romanized as Pāyāneh-ye Bār Yazd) is a village in Fajr Rural District, in the Central District of Yazd County, Yazd Province, Iran. At the 2006 census, its population was 13, in 4 families.

References 

Populated places in Yazd County